Chicago Youth Symphony Orchestras (CYSO) is an orchestral music education organization in Chicago, Illinois that was founded in 1946 to provide music education and instrumental training of the highest quality to Chicago area youth.

Organization
Chicago Youth Symphony Orchestras (CYSO) is located in the Chicago Fine Arts Building on S. Michigan Avenue. CYSO serves more than 600 students ages 6–18 in on-site ensembles including four full orchestras, three string orchestras, jazz orchestra, multiple steel orchestras, and enrichment opportunities including chamber music, masterclasses, and music composition.

CYSO Community Partnership Programs support instrumental music training and music access, reaching 8,500 young people during the 2017-2018 season. The organization works with students in underserved neighborhoods through the Ambassador Program, which brings Chamber Music ensembles to neighborhood schools to perform interactive concerts; after-school ensembles; free community and education concerts; and partners with institutions including Chicago Public Schools (CPS) and The People's Music School.

Programs
On-site Ensembles:
Symphony Orchestra
Philharmonic Orchestra 
Concert Orchestra
Debut Orchestra
Accelerando Strings
Preparatory Strings
Overture Strings
Steel Orchestras
Jazz Orchestra

Enrichment Programs
Chamber Music
Composition Seminar
International Tours
Chamber Orchestra
Conducting Fellowship
Ambassadors

Organizational History
CYSO was founded in 1946 by a group of students who, energized by a summer music camp, wanted to explore music closer to home throughout the school year. They first met on Saturday mornings at the Wurlitzer Music Store on South Wabash Avenue, and in November 1947, 100 young musicians held the first performance at Chicago's Orchestra Hall, featuring a program of Frescobaldi, Beethoven, MacDowell, and Kodaly. In 1960, CYSO moved to the historic Fine Arts Building, a center for arts and culture since 1898.

Notable alumni
Laurie Anderson, performance artist
Anthony McGill, Principal Clarinet, New York Philharmonic
Sheila Johnson, Co-founder of BET and CEO of Salamander Hotels and Resorts
Andrew Bird, Singer/Songwriter
Richard Davis (bassist), Bassist, Educator, Activist
Demarre McGill, Principal Flute, Seattle Symphony
Gordon Peters, Former Principal Percussion, Chicago Symphony Orchestra
Austin Huntington, Principal Cello, Indianapolis Symphony Orchestra
Emma Gerstein, Second Flute, Chicago Symphony Orchestra
Robin Kesselman, Principal Bass, Houston Symphony
Emma Steele, Concertmaster, Royal Danish Orchestra
Ian Ding, Former Principal Percussion, Detroit Symphony Orchestra

Artistic Staff
2017-2018 Season:
 Allen Tinkham - Musical Director and Symphony Orchestra conductor
 Steve Gooden - Symphony Orchestra Assistant Conductor
 Terrance Gray - Associate Conductor and Philharmonic Orchestra conductor
 Daniella Valdez - Director of String Ensembles 
 Dr. Donald Deroche - Director of Chamber Music
 Malika Green - Director of Steel Orchestras
 Pharez Whitted - Jazz Orchestra Director 
 Michael Mascari - Concert Orchestra Conductor 
 Dana Green - Debut Orchestra Conductor
 Anne McTighe - Overture Strings Conductor, Preparatory Strings Assistant Conductor
 Scott McConnell - Steel Orchestras Assistant

Performances
CYSO's various ensembles perform at places including Symphony Center's Orchestra Hall, the Chicago Cultural Center, the South Shore Cultural Center, University of Chicago's Reva and David Logan Center for the Arts, The Studebaker Theater located in the Fine Arts Building Chicago, Chicago's Grant Park, and Pick-Staiger Hall. CYSO's Symphony Orchestra also performs regularly at Millennium Park's Jay Pritzker Pavilion, appearing in the past at the Grant Park Music Festival Independence Day Salute and with Blue Man Group.

International tours
During the 2009 South American Tour to Argentina and Uruguay, the CYSO Symphony Orchestra performed at Teatro Coliseo Podesta in La Plata, La Facultad de Derecho in Buenos Aires, Teatro El Circulo in Rosario, and Teatro Solis in Montevideo. On the 2012 Tour of Spain, students performed in Madrid, in Cuenca in a joint concert with the Joven Orquesta de la Mancha, at Valencia's Palau de la Música Catalana, and Barcelona's Conservatori Superior de Música del Liceu. During the 2014 Tour of China, CYSO's Symphony Orchestra students performed in Beijin at the National Centre for the Performing Arts (China), Xi'an Concert Hall, in Hangzhou at the Opera Hall of the Hangzhou Grand Theater, and at the Shanghai Oriental Art Center. On the most recent tour of Central Europe in 2017, CYSO performed at Belgrade's Kolarac Hall, Budapest's Béla Bartók National Concert Hall, at the Jihlava Mahler Festival at the Church of the Holy Cross, and in a sold-out joint concert with the Symphony Orchestra of the Music High Schools of Prague at Dvorak Hall of the Rudolfinum.

External links
Official site

American youth orchestras
1946 establishments in Illinois
Musical groups established in 1946
Youth organizations based in Illinois
Musical groups from Chicago
Orchestras based in Illinois